For other individuals with the same name, see Paul Williams (disambiguation).

Paul Williams is a Grenadian sprinter. He competed in the Men's 100m event at the 2012 Summer Olympics but was eliminated in the first round.

Personal bests

Outdoor
100 m: 10.49 s (wind: NWI) –  New York City, 29 May 2014
     10.23 s (wind: +0.1 m/s) –  Holmdel, New Jersey, 16 June 2012 (doubtful timing)
200 m: 21.62 s (wind: +0.1 m/s) –  Greensboro, North Carolina, 15 May 2011

Indoor
60 m: 6.69 s –  Albuquerque, New Mexico, 8 February 2014

Achievements

References

External links

All-athletics profile
Sports reference biography
Tilastopaja biography

Living people
Grenadian male sprinters
Olympic athletes of Grenada
Athletes (track and field) at the 2012 Summer Olympics
Athletes (track and field) at the 2014 Commonwealth Games
Commonwealth Games competitors for Grenada
1986 births
People from Saint Patrick Parish, Grenada